was a Japanese textile artist who was based in Okinawa. She created , a cloth made from the fibre of the Musa basjoo, otherwise known as the Japanese fibre banana plant. Taira became a designated Living National Treasure of Japan in 2000.

Biography
Taira was born on 14 February 1921 in Ōgimi. In 1944, Taira worked at a spinning mill in Kurashiki, Okayama. At the encouragement of the mill's owner, Soichiro Ohara, she began to study under Kichinosuke Tonomura, the head of a folk art museum. During this time she was heavily influenced by the  movement.

Following this, Taira began to work more frequently with finer  fibers. During this period, Taira also held some exhibitions of her work. Taira opened a  textile studio in 1963 and hired some local weavers in order to centralize and increase her production.

 was designated as an Important Intangible Cultural Property in 1974. The Kijoka Basho-fu Industrial Cooperative Association was established in 1984, and in 1986, the Ogimi Village Bashofu Hall opened and began offering training. In 2000, Taira was recognized as a Living National Treasure. In 1992 and 2002 she was awarded an Order of the Precious Crown.

Several museums hold her works in their collections, including the Metropolitan Museum of Art and the British Museum.

Taira turned 100 on 14 February 2021, and died on 13 September 2022, at the age of 101.

References 

1921 births
2022 deaths
Japanese centenarians
Japanese textile artists
Living National Treasures of Japan
Order of the Precious Crown members
People from Okinawa Prefecture
Women centenarians